Galawdewos (1521/1522 – 23 March 1559) also known as Mar Gelawdewos, was Emperor of Ethiopia from 3 September 1540 until his death in 1559, and a member of the Solomonic dynasty. His throne name was Asnaph Sagad I (Ge'ez: አጽናፍ ሰገድ). A male line descendant of medieval Amhara kings, he was a younger son of Dawit II and Seble Wongel.

Reign 
His reign was dominated by the struggle with Ahmad ibn Ibrahim al-Ghazi during the Ethiopian–Adal War until Ahmad's defeat and death in the Battle of Wayna Daga on 21 February 1543. Gelawdewos devoted time and energy to rallying his people against Ahmad, a determination his chronicler credits prevented Ahmad's forcible conversions from being permanent. With Ahmad's death, Gelawdewos was not only able to eject the leaderless Muslim forces from the Ethiopian Highlands, but also from the lowlands to the east, which included the Sultanate of Dawaro and Bale. He also turned his attention to the numerous Ethiopians who had crossed over to the Imam's side, either to further themselves or out of self-preservation. While some presented themselves to Gelawdewos expecting to be pardoned only to be executed, to many others he granted his safe conduct, according to Miguel de Castanhoso, "for there were so many [who had joined Imam Ahmad] that had he ordered all to be killed, he would have remained alone."

Campaigns 

In early 1548, Gelawdewos led his army in campaign in the western fringes of the Empire, perhaps in Bizamo, beyond the province of Damot, which was then inhabited by pagans. The campaign lasted six months and ended in victory. When Ahmed Gragn died one of his generals, Garad Abbas, invaded Fetegar against his orders. He would invade many kingdoms, but his campaign was stopped by the Emperor. After the death of Garad Abbas, Gelawdewos invaded all of the Muslim provinces and kingdoms except for Harar. Among the kingdoms he conquered were Dawaro, Fetegar, Bali, and Hadiya. The Ethiopian king then focused on the southwestern side of Ethiopia.

Whilst Gelawdewos was campaigning in the west, Nur ibn Mujahid once again invaded. Gelawdewos's vassal Fanu'el succeeded in repulsing them. In 1550  Ras Fanu'el followed up with a further attack into Muslim territory, plundering the countryside for six months. He further pushed the campaign into Adal, destroying castles and capturing livestock.

After this campaign in the east, a number of revolts were suppressed, in Gumär, and Gambo provinces. During the Ottoman conquest of Habesh, the Ottomans under Özdemir Pasha attacked seized Massawa, Arqiqo and Dahlak in 1557. Gelawdewos relied on the resistance of the population. In the area of Bur, the farmers killed troops and a commander named Yeshaq, and sent the latter's head to the Emperor.

In 1559, Nur ibn Mujahid invaded Fatagar with a force comprising 1800 horsemen and 500 riflemen, and numerous sword and bow-wielding troops. To face that threat, Gelawdewos ordered Ras Hamalmal of Kambata and Ras Fasil to lead two armies against Harar, which they successfully took.
Galawdewos then led his own troops, hastily assembled. On 23 March 1559, the imperial army met Nur ibn Mujahid force in the Battle of Fatagar at a place named Nech Sar, where, according to a Harari chronicle, Gelawdewos was killed in battle. "Early in the engagement Galawdéwos was hit by a bullet, but continued to fight until surrounded by a score of Harari cavalry, who struck him fatally to the ground with their spears," according to Pankhurst. Around the same time as the battle, Barakat ibn Umar Din the last member of the Walasma dynasty was killed defending Harar from Dejazmatch Hamalmal.

Emir Nur had the Emperor's head sent to the country of Sa'ad ad-Din II, then rode off to plunder Ethiopian territory before returning home. The explorer Richard Francis Burton tells a slightly different account, adding that Gelawdewos had been supervising the restoration of Debre Werq when he received a message from Emir Nur challenging him to combat. When the Emperor met the Emir, a priest warned that the angel Gabriel had told him Gelawdewos would needlessly risk his life—which caused most of the Ethiopian army to flee.

According to G. W. B. Huntingford, Gelawdewos' body was buried at Tadbaba Maryam near Sayint and his head, which was brought back to Ethiopia by some traders, was buried in Ensaqya (now in Antsokiyana Gemza) in the Tomb of Saint Gelawdewos.

Foreign relations 
The first problem of foreign relations Gelawdewos had to deal with following his victory at Wayna Daga was João Bermudes, a Portuguese priest whom his father had sent abroad as his ambassador to secure help from Portugal. Bermudes had represented himself in Europe as the properly appointed Patriarch of Ethiopia (or Abuna), and once he returned to Ethiopia, he claimed he had been appointed by Pope Paul III as Patriarch of Alexandria. A surviving letter dated 13 March 1546 from John III of Portugal to Emperor Gelawdewos, translated by Whiteway, is a response to a lost letter wherein the Ethiopian ruler asked, in essence, "Who is this João Bermudes fellow? And why does he behave so irresponsibly?" King John's answer was frank:

According to Bermudes' own account of his time in Ethiopia, early in the reign of Gelawdewos he was banished to Gafat south of the Blue Nile (Amharic Abbay), the first of several exiles that ended when Bermudes left Ethiopia. This banishment probably followed Gelawdewos' receipt of King John's letter.

In the same letter, King John promised to send priests more worthy than Bermudes, and during his reign two different groups of Jesuit missionaries arrived in Ethiopia. The first group arrived 7 February 1555 to determine the state of the country and whether the Ethiopians would properly receive a Patriarch anointed by the Catholic Church. Gelawdewos received them, but gave them no overt encouragement. The second group landed in March 1557, and was headed by Andrés de Oviedo, who had been made titular bishop of Nice. Gelawdewos received them just before leaving to campaign against Nur ibn Mujahid but did not make any promises.

In response to their arguments, Gelawdewos wrote his Confession, which defended the Miaphysitism of the Ethiopian Orthodox Tewahedo Church. According to Richard Pankhurst, Gelawdewos' Confession helped his fellow Ethiopian Christians to remain "steadfast in their adherence to Sabbath observance, circumcision, and the prohibition against pork and other 'unclean' foods."

Ethiopia's access to the outside world was severely crippled during his reign in 1557 when the Ottoman Empire conquered Massawa. From that point forward, dignitaries and missionaries to Ethiopia had to travel in disguise to avoid Muslim authorities. This also allowed the Ottomans to block the Ethiopians from importing firearms.

Family 
Gelawdewos had no sons, but had two daughters named Sabana Giyorgis and Mashihawit.

References

Works cited

Further reading 
 Richard K. P. Pankhurst. The Ethiopian Royal Chronicles. Addis Ababa: Oxford University Press, 1967.

1520s births
1559 deaths
16th-century monarchs in Africa
16th-century emperors of Ethiopia
Year of birth uncertain
Solomonic dynasty
Monarchs killed in action